Kafr Burayshah, also referred to as Kafr Barja, is a village in northern Aleppo Governorate, northwestern Syria.

The village administratively belongs to Nahiya Sawran in Azaz District. Nearby localities include Nayarah  to the southwest and Shamarikh  to the northwest.

Demographics
In the 2004 census, Kafr Burayshah had a population of 126. In late 19th century, traveler Martin Hartmann noted Kafar Parcha as a Turkish and Arab (Bedouin) mixed village, then located in the Ottoman nahiyah of Azaz-i Turkman, composed of 10 households.

References

Populated places in Azaz District
Villages in Aleppo Governorate
Turkmen communities in Syria